This is a list of awards and nominations received by Himesh Reshammiya.

Filmfare Awards

Star Screen Awards

Zee Cine Awards

IIFA Awards

Star Guild Awards

BIG Star Entertainment Awards

Bollywood Movie Awards

MTV Immies

Stardust Awards

Mirchi Music Awards

Vijay Awards

References

External links
 Awards for Himesh Reshammiya at IMDb

Reshammiya, Himesh
Lists of awards received by Indian actor
Himesh Reshammiya